Irina Sergeyevna Brzhevskaya (27 December 192917 April 2019) was a Russian pop singer and soprano.

Early life
Irina was born in Moscow in the family of People's Artist of the RSFSR Sergey Brzhesky. In her childhood she studied ballet and theatrical circles of the Pioneers Palace.

In 1947, entered the vocal department of the musical school, transformed in 1951 into the department of musical comedy of GITIS. He studied with Boris Pokrovsky.

Career 
In 1953 Irina was accepted as a soloist in a railway jazz orchestra under the direction of Dmitry Pokrass. Two years later Brzhevskaya performed with the orchestra of Eddie Rosner.

In 1957 she became the organizer of ensemble Vesna, with which she performed until 1991.

Recognition 
 Winner of the festival of pop songs in Dresden (1964) 
 Honored Artist of the RSFSR (1978) 
 Order of Honour (2000)

Personal life 
Her husband Vladimir Zabrodin (born 1930) was a trumpeter.

References

External links
 Ирина Бржевская 
 Ирина Бржевская. Девушка с характером. 

1929 births
2019 deaths
Singers from Moscow
Soviet sopranos
Russian sopranos
Soviet pop singers
Russian pop singers
20th-century Russian women singers
21st-century Russian women singers
20th-century Russian singers
21st-century Russian singers
Recipients of the Order of Honour (Russia)
Honored Artists of the RSFSR
Russian Academy of Theatre Arts alumni